Karine Rambault (born 5 April 1971) is a French judoka. She competed in the women's middleweight event at the 2000 Summer Olympics.

References

1971 births
Living people
French female judoka
Olympic judoka of France
Judoka at the 2000 Summer Olympics
Sportspeople from Angers
Universiade silver medalists for France
Universiade medalists in judo
21st-century French women
20th-century French women